Gustav Vigeland (11 April 1869 – 12 March 1943), born as Adolf Gustav Thorsen, was a Norwegian sculptor. Gustav Vigeland occupies a special position among Norwegian sculptors, both in the power of his creative imagination and in his productivity. He is most associated with the Vigeland installation (Vigelandsanlegget) in Frogner Park, Oslo. He was also the designer of the Nobel Peace Prize medal.

Early life
Adolf Gustav Thorsen was born to a family of craftsmen, just outside Halse og Harkmark, a former municipality in Mandal. His parents were Elesæus Thorsen (1835–1886), a cabinetmaker and Anne Aanensdatter (1835–1907). He had three brothers, of whom Emanuel Vigeland (originally Thorsen) became a noted artist. As a youth, he was sent to Oslo where he learned wood carving at a local school. However, the sudden death of his father compelled him to move back to Mandal to help his family. Gustav lived for a time with his grandparents on a farm called Mjunebrokka in Vigeland, an old farm in Valle parish, Lindesnes municipality in Vest-Agder county.

He returned to Oslo in 1888, this time determined to become a professional sculptor. He came to the attention of sculptor Brynjulf Bergslien, who supported him and gave him practical training. The following year he exhibited his first work, Hagar and Ishmael. In his 20s, he adopted the new family name Vigeland, from the area he had briefly lived.

Vigeland spent the years 1891 to 1896 in several voyages abroad, including Copenhagen, Paris, Berlin and Florence. In the French capital he frequented Auguste Rodin's workshop, while in Italy he experimented with ancient and Renaissance artworks. In these years the themes that would later dominate his inspiration - death and the relationship between man and woman - first appeared. He held his first personal exhibitions in Norway in 1894 and 1896, which received notable critical praise.

Early public works
Until 1902 Vigeland was engaged in the restoration of the Nidaros Cathedral in Trondheim. The contact with Mediaeval art contributed to another frequent theme in Vigeland's art, the dragon as symbol of sin but also as a nature force, fighting against man.

Back in Oslo, he obtained from the town an abandoned studio in which to work. In 1905 Norway became independent from Sweden. Vigeland, considered the most talented Norwegian sculptor, received numerous commissions for statues and busts celebrating renowned compatriots like Henrik Ibsen and Niels Henrik Abel.

In 1906 Vigeland proposed a chalk model for a monumental fountain. Initially, the idea of the Oslo municipality was to put the fountain in Eidsvolls plass, the square in front of the Parliament of Norway. His work was generally welcomed, but the location created a dispute: completion of the work was postponed by the dispute. In the meantime Vigeland enlarged the original project, adding several sculpture groups. The high granite column was added to the design in 1919.

Vigeland installation

Gustav Vigeland is most widely known for the Vigeland installation, a permanent sculpture installation in Frogner Park in Oslo.

In 1921 the City of Oslo decided to demolish the house where Vigeland lived and build a library. After a long dispute, Vigeland was granted a new building from the city where he could work and live; in exchange, he promised to donate to the city all his subsequent works, including sculptures, drawings, engravings and models.

Vigeland moved to his new studio on Nobels gate in the borough of Frogner during 1924. His studio was located in the vicinity of Frogner Park, which he had chosen as the definitive location for his fountain. Over the following twenty years, Vigeland was devoted to the project of an open exhibition of his works, which later turned into what is known as Vigeland Sculpture Arrangement (Vigelandsanlegget) in Frogner Park. The Vigeland installation features 212 bronze and granite sculptures all designed by Gustav Vigeland. The sculptures culminate in the famous Monolith (Monolitten), with its 121 figures struggling to reach the top of the sculpture.

Vigeland Museum

Vigeland lived and worked at his studio on Nobels gate until his death in 1943. His ashes are still preserved there in the belfry of the building. According to the agreement with the City of Oslo, the building became the Vigeland Museum (Vigelandsmuseet).

The site is located immediately south of the Vigeland Sculpture Arrangement. Vigeland's flat on the third floor was preserved as a part of the museum which houses various works by the artist, along with the plaster models of the Vigeland sculptures in Frogner Park.

Legacy
Some art critics considered Vigeland's sculptures to be expressions of nazi or fascist aesthetics, and he has been compared to Arno Breker. Writing in Verdens Gang, a newspaper started by former Norwegian resistance members shortly after the German occupation of Norway ended in 1945, Pola Gauguin wrote that the Vigeland installation "reeks of Nazi mentality.” However, this view may be subjective, as the works in the installation simply depict family life, from birth to death and beyond. The assessment of Strømodden finds no political themes. 

Posterity, a 2015 play by Doug Wright, imagined the interaction between Vigeland and Henrik Ibsen.

References

Sources
Gjengset, Gunnar Forsteinet liv. En biografisk fortelling om Gustav Vigeland (Direkte forlaget. 2000)  Norwegian
Hennum, Gerd 	Gustav Vigeland i svart og hvitt (Fædrelandsvennen. 1985) . Norwegian
Wikborg, Tone 	Gustav Vigeland - mennesket og kunsten (Oslo: Aschehoug, 1983)  Norwegian
Wikborg, Tone	Gustav Vigeland - His Art and Sculpture Park (Oslo: Aschehoug, 1985) .
Wikborg, Tone 	Gustav Vigeland. En biografi (Gyldendal. 2001) . Norwegian
Stępnik, Małgorzata Modernist sculpture parks and their ideological contexts – on the basis of the oeuvres by Gustav Vigeland, Bernhard Hoetger and Einar Jónsson, „The Polish Journal of Aesthetics”, No 47 (4/2017), pp. 143–169.

External links

Vigeland Museum website
Frogner Park's Friends
Map of Frogner Park and the Vigeland Sculpture Arrangement
Vigeland Sculpture Garden picture gallery
Gustav Vigeland's house in Mandal
Gallery Gustav Vigeland in Lindesnes

1869 births
1943 deaths
People from Vest-Agder
People from Mandal, Norway
Modern sculptors
Norwegian sculptors
20th-century sculptors
19th-century sculptors
Artists from Oslo